ContraPest is a contraceptive pest control tool designed to reduce fertility in brown and black rats. It was developed by the U.S. biotechnology company SenesTech.

It is a sugary liquid, designed to be attractive to, and to be consumed by rats in order to eliminate future potential offspring. However, it does not sterilize the rats, so a continuous supply is required. The company claims that in field tests, ContraPest use caused a reduction in rat populations of roughly 40% over a period of 12 weeks or longer. The product was approved for commercial use by the U.S. Environmental Protection Agency in August 2016.

History 
The formula was originally used by Dr. Loretta Mayer and Dr. Cheryl Dyer as part of a research program to study heart disease in post-menopausal women through menopausal mice. The active ingredient of ContraPest is the chemical 4-vinylcyclohexene diepoxide (VCD), which is a known to work when injected into peritoneal cavities of a target animal. 

The efficacy of VCD in oral ingestion is highly questionable but ConstraPest is utilizing oral ingestion as a major uptake method. The VCD is known for fast degradation and its metabolic pathway is extremely brief. ContraPest also contains triptolide, which the company reports the adverse reproductive effects on both males and females.  However, there is significant lack of evidence that triptolide works on female rats.

Deployment 
The city of Washington D.C. was utilizing a 5,000 unit, four-year supply of ContraPest to be used in all eight wards of the city in an attempt to combat the increasing rat population in 2020. Contrapest was used in the major cities in the Unites States but also failed to maintain repeated, long-term contracts due to limited efficacy in outdoor environments.  The local news 4 Washington reported that the district was unsure of the company's early claims of success in rat control.   Although the manufacturer's made an early success in controlling the rodent population, the district complaint increased from 3,727 to 4,341 calls during the first 6 months while ContraPest was used in the Washington D.C.( Please refer to the reference 9.)

References 

Reproductive toxins
Mammal pest control